Mary Anderson (born 1926) is an American former figure skater. She competed in ice dance with her brother Jack.

Competitive highlights
Ice Dance (with Jack)

 1945 - Bronze in Fours (Ice Dance) with Patricia Ryan, Gary Wilson, and Henry Trenkamp

References

1926 births
Possibly living people
American female ice dancers